Attorney General Jones may refer to:
Buell F. Jones (1892–1947), Attorney General of South Dakota
Edward Warburton Jones (1912–1993), Attorney General for Northern Ireland
Elwyn Jones, Baron Elwyn-Jones (1909–1989), Attorney General for England and Wales
Isaac Dashiell Jones (1806–1893), Attorney General of Maryland
Jim Jones (judge) (born 1942), Attorney General of Idaho
Lawrence C. Jones (1893–1972), Attorney General of Vermont
Ross F. Jones (1900–1979),  Attorney General of Arizona
W. Claude Jones (died 1884), Attorney General of Hawaii
William Jones (law officer) (1631–1682), Attorney General for England and Wales
Wiley E. Jones (1856–1924), Attorney General of Arizona
William Carey Jones (1855–1927), Attorney General of Washington

See also
General Jones (disambiguation)